Maeve Donnelly is one of the top Irish traditional fiddle players known for her unique style within the traditional Irish music genre.

Life and education
Donnelly was born near Kylemore Abbey in Loughrea in East Galway, Ireland. She now lives in Quin, County Clare . She has been playing music since she was a child and won her first All-Ireland Fiddle Competition when she was nine despite her parents not being musicians. However her family has developed a musical tradition with her three brothers playing the accordion, banjo, and fiddle.

Donnelly toured the US for the 1976 Bicentennial celebration, and again in 1978 and 1983. She went on to win two more All-Ireland fiddle titles in the 1970s and the National Slogadh Competition for Solo Fiddle and The Stone Fiddle Competition in County Fermanagh in 1981.

Donnelly went to college in Dublin and when she graduated she moved to live in Clare. She works touring, recording and tutoring when she isn't working as a teacher.

Discography

 Sailing Into Walpole's Marsh - Mairéad Ní Domhnaill, Sean Corcoran, Eddie Clarke, Maeve Donnelly - 1977
 Moving Cloud - Paul Brock, Manus McGuire, Kevin Crawford, Carl Hession, Maeve Donnelly - 1995
 Foxglove - Moving Cloud - 1998
 Her Infinite Variety - Celtic Women (compilation album) - 1998
 Éigse Dhiarmuidín - Live recordings in concert (compilation album) - 2001
 Maeve Donnelly - Maeve Donnelly - 2002
 The Thing Itself - Maeve Donnelly, Peadar O'Loughlin - 2004
 Flame On The Banks - Maeve Donnelly with Tony McManus - 2008
 Musical analysis of album contents at irishtune.info

References

External links
Maeve Donnelly
Maeve Donnelly for Irish Music magazine

Living people
People from County Galway
Irish violinists
Irish women violinists
21st-century violinists
Year of birth missing (living people)
Claddagh Records artists